Geertruida Anna "Truus" Dekker (13 May 1922 – 8 January 2022) was a Dutch actress.

Biography
She died in Amsterdam on 8 January 2022, at the age of 99. Dekkers graduated from the Academy of Theatre and Dance in 1946, and first became known for her acting in television series by Wim T. Schippers. She acted in Dutch films like Turkish Delight, Soldier of Orange and Spetters. Her last performance was in Dokter Tinus in 2013.

Filmography

References

1922 births
2022 deaths
20th-century Dutch actresses
21st-century Dutch actresses
People from Zaanstad